Camp Edwin F. Glenn is a national historic district located at Fort Benjamin Harrison, Indianapolis, Indiana. It encompasses 19 contributing buildings and 360 contributing structures in a former military camp. The district developed between about 1925 and 1941. It originally served as a Citizens' Military Training Camp from 1925 to 1941, a camp for the Civilian Conservation Corps from 1933 to 1941, and a Prisoner of War camp from 1944 to 1945. The district includes six warehouses, five mess halls, five lavatories, a branch exchange, butcher shop, latrine, and 360 concrete tent pads.

It was listed on the National Register of Historic Places in 1995.

Gallery

References

External links

Prisoner of war camps in the United States
Civilian Conservation Corps in Indiana
Historic districts on the National Register of Historic Places in Indiana
Historic districts in Indianapolis
National Register of Historic Places in Indianapolis
Temporary populated places on the National Register of Historic Places